Nagar River can refer to:

Bangladesh
Nagar River (Rajshahi), a river beginning in Bogra District and joining the Atrai River in Natore District
Nagar River (Rangpur), a river that crosses the border from India in Panchagarh district and returns to India in Thakurgaon District

India
Nagar River (India), a river in the Uttar Dinajpur district of West Bengal

Pakistan
Hispar River (aka Nagar River), a river that joins the Hunza River in Gilgit-Baltistan